CSS General Beauregard was a cottonclad  sidewheel ram of the Confederate Navy during the American Civil War.

Built in Algiers, Louisiana in 1847 as a towboat, the paddle steamer Ocean was selected in January 1862 by Capt. James E. Montgomery, former river steamboat master, for his River Defense Fleet. At New Orleans, on 25 January, Captain Montgomery began her conversion to a cotton-clad ram, installing    oak and   iron sheathing over her bow, with cotton bales sandwiched between double pine bulkheads to protect her boilers.

Service history

Battle of Plum Point Bend
Conversion completed on 5 April, and now renamed CSS General Beauregard, the ship steamed to Fort Pillow, Tennessee, to defend the approaches to Memphis. On 10 May 1862, General Beauregard, Capt. J. H. Hart, and seven more of Montgomery's fleet, attacked the Federal Mississippi ironclad flotilla. The Battle of Plum Point Bend witnessed effective ramming tactics by the Confederates, although General Beauregard succeeded only in keeping her four 8-inch guns bravely firing in the face of a withering hail of Union shells. Montgomery's force held off the Federal rams until Fort Pillow was safely evacuated, 4 June, then fell back on Memphis to coal, on the fifth.

Battle of Memphis
After Fort Pillow fell, Flag Officer Charles Henry Davis, USN, commanding the Mississippi River Squadron, lost no time in appearing off Memphis, on 6 June 1862. Montgomery, with a smaller squadron short of fuel, was unable to retreat to Vicksburg; unwilling to destroy his boats, he fought against heavy odds. In the ensuing Battle of Memphis, "witnessed by thousands on the bluff," Beauregard unluckily missed ramming  and "cut away entirely the port wheel and wheel-house" of her partner, CSS General Sterling Price, also engaging Monarch. General Beauregard, backing out, gave Union flagship  a close broadside with a 42-pounder, and Benton replied with a shot into the Confederate's boiler, killing or scalding many of her crew, 14 of whom, in agony, were rescued by Benton. General Beauregard exploded and was sinking fast as Monarch captured the rest of her complement and took her in tow towards the Arkansas shore, where the wreck remained for a short time partially visible in shoal water.

See also
Bibliography of early American naval history

References

External links
 Naval Historical Center Online Library of Selected Images: CSS General Beauregard

 

	

Cottonclad rams of the Confederate States Navy
Ships built in New Orleans
1847 ships
Shipwrecks of the American Civil War
Shipwrecks of the Mississippi River
Maritime incidents in June 1862